William Frederick Lemke (August 13, 1878 – May 30, 1950) was an American politician who represented North Dakota in the United States House of Representatives as a member of the Republican Party. He was also the Union Party's presidential candidate in the 1936 presidential election.

Life and career
As a boy, Lemke worked long hours on the family farm, attending a common school for only three months in the summers. However, the family did reserve enough money to send him to the University of North Dakota, where he was not only a superior student, but also well known for his ability to impersonate the professors. Graduating in 1902, he stayed at the state university for the first year of law school but moved to Georgetown University, then to Yale Law School, where he finished work on his law degree and won the praise of the dean. He returned to his home state in 1905 to set up practice at Fargo. Lemke was a Freemason.

Lemke was the attorney general of North Dakota from 1921 to 1922. Later, in 1932, he was elected to the United States House of Representatives, as a member of the Non-Partisan League (NPL).

While in Congress, Lemke earned a reputation as a progressive populist and supporter of the New Deal, championing the causes of family farmers and co-sponsoring legislation to protect farmers against foreclosures during the Great Depression.

In 1934, Lemke co-sponsored the Frazier–Lemke Farm Bankruptcy Act, restricting the ability of banks to repossess farms.  President Franklin D. Roosevelt signed the act into law on June 28, 1934. The Act was later struck down by the Supreme Court in Louisville Joint Stock Land Bank v. Radford. Lemke tried to get the Act re-passed by Congress, but was stymied by the Roosevelt administration which privately told Congressmen that they would exercise a Presidential veto against the bill. The Act was eventually re-passed and later held constitutional by the Supreme Court. Lemke was a political friend and ally of Louisiana populist Huey Long prior to his assassination in 1935.

In June 1936, Lemke accepted the nomination of the Union Party, a short-lived third party, as its candidate for President of the United States. He received 892,378 votes, or just under two percent nationwide, and no electoral votes in the 1936 election. Lemke did outpoll Alf Landon in six North Dakota counties and remained the last third-party presidential candidate to outpoll a major-party nominee in any non-southern county until George Wallace outpolled Hubert Humphrey in Utah's arch-Republican Kane County in 1968 and his successor John G. Schmitz outpolled George McGovern in four Idaho counties in 1972. Simultaneously, he was reelected to the House of Representatives as a Republican. Many believe Lemke's acceptance of the Union Party nomination in 1936 was out of bitterness toward Roosevelt over the farm mortgage issue. Through the Union Party, Lemke befriended other populists such as Fr. Charles Coughlin.

In 1940, having already received the Republican nomination for a fifth House term, he withdrew from that race to launch an unsuccessful run as an independent for the U.S. Senate. He ran again for the House in 1942 as a Republican and served four more terms, until his death in 1950.

From 1943 to 1948, Lemke was the champion for establishment of the Theodore Roosevelt National Memorial Park (now Theodore Roosevelt National Park). The National Park Service did not support this proposal, and oddly enough Lemke was no admirer of Theodore Roosevelt, but he seems to have pursued the establishment of a park in anticipation of the economic benefits it might bring to the region. His efforts were ultimately successful, with the park established by act of Congress in June, 1948.

Lemke died of a heart attack in Fargo, North Dakota and is buried in Riverside Cemetery. Former Atlanta Braves baseball player Mark Lemke is Lemke's second cousin twice removed.

Bibliography
 Edward C. Blackorby. "William Lemke: Agrarian Radical and Union Party Presidential Candidate," The Mississippi Valley Historical Review, Vol. 49, No. 1. (Jun., 1962), pp. 67–84. in JSTOR
 William Lemke Papers at The University of North Dakota University of North Dakota.
 "Lemke, William" in American National Biography. American Council of Learned Societies, 2000.

See also
 List of United States Congress members who died in office (1950–99)

References

Notes

External links

 Dakota Datebook -- August 13, 2004 from North Dakota Public Radio (via PrairiePublic.org) -- article on Lemke
"Memorial services held in the House of Representatives of the United States, together with remarks presented in eulogy of William Lemke, late a representative from North Dakota frontispiece 1951"

|-

|-

|-

1878 births
1950 deaths
20th-century American politicians
American people of German descent
Candidates in the 1936 United States presidential election
Georgetown University Law Center alumni
Nonpartisan League members of the United States House of Representatives
North Dakota Attorneys General
North Dakota Democrats
North Dakota Independents
North Dakota lawyers
People from Albany, Minnesota
People from Towner County, North Dakota
Republican Party members of the United States House of Representatives from North Dakota
University of North Dakota alumni
Yale Law School alumni
Union Party (United States) politicians